Léo-Ernest Ouimet (March 16, 1877 - March 2, 1972) was a Canadian film pioneer. He was a theater operator, filmmaker, producer, and distributor.

Early life 
Ouimet was born on March 16, 1877, in Laval, Quebec. He planned a career in electrical engineering but stumbled upon show business by chance in 1901, when Le Theatre National in Montreal asked him to rewire the theatre building. Not only did he do the job in just two days but he devised a creative lighting system that wowed audiences. Other theatres, such as the Le Cartier Theatre asked him to do the same in their theatres and he became an instant success. Le Theatre National asked Ouimet to come back to work for them as a lighting designer, and a legal loophole launched his movie career: by law, Le Theatre National was not allowed to operate in any closed venue on Sundays, so to get around this, performances took place at Sohmers Park on Sundays. From 1902 onwards, the theatre screened animations during intermissions and the projectionist showed Ouimet how to use the theatre's kinetoscope. He subsequently bought one for himself and began experimenting.

First steps into filmmaking 
Due to his fascination with Edison products, he became their representative in eastern Canada and set up his own Ouimet Film Exchange to facilitate the distribution of films in the region. During the 1904 federal election he used his kinetoscope to project election results on to the front wall of the newspaper La Patrie and in 1906 turned an abandoned cabaret house into a nickelodeon of 500 seats. Due to the technical restrictions placed on the kinetoscope by Edison to maintain control over the market, Ouimet modified his into a 'Ouimetoscope' and in 1907 opened a 1200-seat movie theatre which he also named Ouimetoscope. His films were shown around Canada and made Quebec the theatre hotspot of the country.

A booming business 

In 1911, the religious leaders of Montreal attempted to have movie screenings on Sundays banned, similar to the restriction placed on theatres in Ouimet's early filmmaking days. The backlash did affect Ouimet for quite a while, and, along with other factors, almost financially ruined him. However, the ban was rejected by the Supreme Court soon after its introduction. By World War I Ouimet had made over 80 best-selling films, making him one of the most successful filmmakers of that period. Unlike many other move theatre owners of his time, Ouimet didn't include live performances in between films just in case the movie industry went bust, but he did hand out programs or showbills to his patrons to keep the theatre-like experience alive.

Ouimet, weary from battles with Hollywood film studios who flooded Quebec with their movies, sold his Ouimetoscope and moved to Hollywood in 1922. There he formed a production company, Laval Photoplays, after his birthplace. After the dismal sales of his film Why Get Married?, Ouimet decided to leave commercial filmmaking. Back in Montreal, he attempted to rebuild his theatre business by leasing another building, but he was again financially ruined due to the lawsuits of the descendants of those killed in a fire at his theatre. With no motivation to continue, he retired to a store job with the Quebec Liquor Commission and died on March 2, 1972, aged 94.

In 2018, Ouimet was named a National Historic Person by the federal government.

References 

 L'Encyclopédie du Canada: édition 2000, Montréal, Stanké, 2000, p. 1782
 Bélanger, Les ouimetoscopes : Léo-Ernest Ouimet et les débuts du cinéma québécois, Montréal, VLB, 1978, 247 p.

1877 births
1972 deaths
People from Laval, Quebec
Canadian cinema pioneers
Film distributors (people)
Film directors from Quebec
French Quebecers
Film producers from Quebec
Film exhibitors